Korpokkur, also written Koro-pok-kuru, korobokkuru, korbokkur, or koropokkur, koro-pok-guru, are a race of small people in folklore of the Ainu people of the northern Japanese islands.  The name is traditionally analysed as a tripartite compound of kor ("butterbur plant"), pok ("under, below"), and kur ("person") and interpreted to mean "people below the leaves of the Fuki" in the Ainu language.

The Ainu believe that the korpokkur were the people who lived in the Ainu's land before the Ainu themselves lived there. They were short of stature, agile, and skilled at fishing. They lived in pits with roofs made from butterbur leaves.

Long ago, the korpokkur were on good terms with the Ainu, and would send them deer, fish, and other game and exchange goods with them. The little people hated to be seen, however, so they would stealthily make their deliveries under the cover of night.

One day, a young Ainu man decided he wanted to see a korpokkur for himself, so he waited in ambush by the window where their gifts were usually left. When a korpokkur came to place something there, the young man grabbed it by the hand and dragged it inside. It turned out to be a beautiful korpokkur woman, who was so enraged at the young man's rudeness that her people have not been seen since. Their pits, pottery, and stone implements, the Ainu believe, still remain scattered about the landscape.

See also
Okhotsk culture
Penglai Mountain
Saisiyat people
Pas-ta'ai

Further reading
  (Harvard University) (digitized Jan 20, 2006)

References

External links
 Ainu Entry from the 1911 Encyclopædia Britannica which includes a somewhat different interpretation of the koro-pok-guru.

Ainu legendary creatures
Dwarves (folklore)